Mini Desktop Racing is a racing video game published by Metro 3D and developed by Data Design Interactive. It was released on PC and PlayStation 2 formats in July 2005.  A Wii version was released in Australia on 22 November 2007, and 23 November 2007 in Europe and North America.

Gameplay
Much like the popular Micro Machines, Mini Desktop Racing is displayed with a top-down view. Players race in a variety of mini cars around a variety of desktop areas. The game offers reasonably interactive courses by allowing players to "turn on fans" and "spill drinks" in attempts to hinder opponents. Every level has a variety of different things that can be interacted with. The game can be played in single-player mode, in which you can race against one or more computer-controlled opponents or in multiplayer where you can race against one other friend.

The Wii version of the game is controlled with the Wii Remote pointed forward, which the player holds in one hand and twists left or right to steer, similar to drag races in the Wii version of Need for Speed: Pro Street, as well as the one-handed control scheme for the Wii version of Need for Speed: Nitro.

Reception and publicity
In 2005, Mini Desktop Racing had very poor advertising, making it a relatively unknown game. Reviews are difficult to come by, though most critics gave the game low scores, criticizing primarily its poor presentation. Most internet gaming sites, such as IGN or GameSpot, feature the game in their databases.  Mark Bozon of IGN gave the Wii version of the game a 1.2, criticizing the game's reuse of Offroad Extremes engine, poor graphics and unwieldy controls.

References

2005 video games
PlayStation 2 games
Racing video games
Video games developed in the United Kingdom
Data Design Interactive games
Wii games
Windows games
Conspiracy Entertainment games
Metro3D games